George Lankham (6 September 1830 – 4 November 1908) was a New Zealand cricketer. He played three first-class matches for Auckland in 1873/74.

See also
 List of Auckland representative cricketers

References

External links
 

1830 births
1908 deaths
Auckland cricketers
Cricketers from Perth, Scotland
New Zealand cricketers